Antonio Méndez Esparza (born 7 January 1976) is a Spanish filmmaker based in the United States. He teaches at the Florida State University College of Motion Picture Arts.

Life and career
Méndez Esparza was born in Madrid, where he obtained a law degree. He studied filmmaking at the University of California, Los Angeles, and at Columbia University, where he received an MFA.

His 2009 short film Time and Again won the narrative short prize at the Los Angeles Film Festival and earned him a Latino filmmaker prize at the Directors Guild of America's Student Film Awards. His first feature, Aquí y allá, premiered in the International Critics' Week at the 2012 Cannes Film Festival and won the section's Grand Prize. The film also received a special mention at the 2012 AFI Fest and earned him a nomination for the Gotham Award for Breakthrough Director. Both films depict experiences of Mexican migrants to the United States with non-professional actors.

His second feature, Life and Nothing More, premiered at the 2017 Toronto International Film Festival and won the John Cassavetes Award at the Independent Spirit Awards. Shot in Tallahassee with a small crew and non-professional actors, the film depicts a struggling African-American family in Florida.

His third feature and first documentary, Courtroom 3H, premiered in competition at the 2020 San Sebastián International Film Festival. The film documents proceedings in a Tallahassee family court presided by a judge with whom Méndez Esparza became acquainted while making Life and Nothing More.

In 2022, he directed the comedy thriller Something Is About to Happen, which he co-wrote with Clara Roquet based on the novel  by Juan José Millás, in Spain.

Filmography

References

External links
 

1976 births
Living people
Film directors from Madrid
Spanish film directors
Spanish documentary film directors
Spanish male screenwriters
Film educators
Florida State University faculty
Columbia University School of the Arts alumni
Spanish emigrants to the United States